Jazz Maturity...Where It's Coming From is a 1975 album featuring Oscar Peterson, Dizzy Gillespie and Roy Eldridge.

Reception

In a retrospective review writing for AllMusic, critic Scott Yanow wrote "The material performed for this CD reissue is just not all that inspiring—a few overly played standards and blues. Despite some good efforts by Gillespie and Eldridge, pianist Oscar Peterson easily emerges as the most impressive soloist; better to acquire the magnificent collaborations of the 1950s instead."

Track listing
 "Quasi-Boogaloo" (Roy Eldridge, Dizzy Gillespie, Oscar Peterson) – 9:01
 "Take the "A" Train" (Billy Strayhorn) – 8:08
 "I Cried for You (Now It's Your Turn to Cry Over Me)" (Gus Arnheim, Arthur Freed, Abe Lyman) – 7:52
 "Drebirks" (Eldridge, Gillespie, Peterson) – 11:18
 "When It's Sleepy Time Down South" (Clarence Muse, Leon René, Otis Rene) – 6:17
 "(Back Home Again in) Indiana" (James F. Hanley, Ballard MacDonald) – 6:40

Personnel

Performance
 Oscar Peterson – piano
 Roy Eldridge – trumpet
 Dizzy Gillespie - trumpet
 Ray Brown - bass
 Mickey Roker - drums

References 

1975 albums
Oscar Peterson albums
Roy Eldridge albums
Dizzy Gillespie albums
Pablo Records albums
Albums produced by Norman Granz